The Marino class of diving support vessels consists of two units operated by the Italian Marina Militare. The vessels are used by Comando Subacquei Incursori (COMSUBIN) for training and operational duties and are named MAS Motoscafo Appoggio Subacquei (DSV Diving Support Vessel).

Features 
Alcide Pederetti is assigned to diving support and for submarine rescue operations 
It's fitted with:
a hyperbaric chamber DRASS Galeazzi, for 4+2 persons.
diving support equipment, until -80 m deep.

Ships

References

External links 
 Mario Marino (Y 498) Marina Militare website

Auxiliary ships of the Italian Navy
1984 ships
Ships built in Italy
Auxiliary ship classes